Emerson is a borough in Bergen County, in the U.S. state of New Jersey, a suburb in the New York City metropolitan area. Emerson is the most southern municipality in an area of the county known as the Pascack Valley. As of the 2020 United States census, the borough's population was 7,290, a decrease of 111 (−1.5%) from the 2010 census count of 7,401, which in turn reflected an increase of 204 (+2.8%) from the 7,197 counted in the 2000 Census, which had in turn increased by 267 (+3.9%) from the 6,930 counted in the 1990 Census.

What is now Emerson was originally formed on April 8, 1903, from portions of Washington Township as the Borough of Etna, the name of a railroad station in the community. The name was changed to Emerson as of March 9, 1909. The name came from author Ralph Waldo Emerson. The borough calls itself "The Family Town".

Geography
According to the United States Census Bureau, the borough had a total area of 2.42 square miles (6.27 km2), including 2.23 square miles (5.78 km2) of land and 0.19 square miles (0.49 km2) of water (7.85%).

Unincorporated communities, localities and place names located partially or completely within the borough include Old Hook.

The borough borders the Bergen County municipalities of Closter, Harrington Park, Haworth, Oradell, Paramus, River Vale, Washington Township and Westwood.

Demographics

2010 census

The Census Bureau's 2006–2010 American Community Survey showed that (in 2010 inflation-adjusted dollars) median household income was $99,292 (with a margin of error of +/− $12,946) and the median family income was $108,300 (+/− $12,689). Males had a median income of $71,868 (+/− $16,071) versus $69,271 (+/− $15,233) for females. The per capita income for the borough was $39,501 (+/− $4,093). About 0.7% of families and 1.1% of the population were below the poverty line, including none of those under age 18 and 4.5% of those age 65 or over.

Same-sex couples headed 17 households in 2010, an increase from the 14 counted in 2000.

2000 census
As of the 2000 United States census there were 7,197 people, 2,373 households, and 1,964 families residing in the borough. The population density was 3,216.3 people per square mile (1,240.5/km2). There were 2,398 housing units at an average density of 1,071.7 per square mile (413.3/km2). The racial makeup of the borough was 89.62% White, 0.85% African American, 0.06% Native American, 7.89% Asian, 0.88% from other races, and 0.71% from two or more races. Hispanic or Latino of any race were 4.61% of the population.

As of the 2000 Census, 2.2% of Emerson's residents identified themselves as being of Armenian-American ancestry. This was the 20th highest percentage of Armenian American people in any place in the United States with 1,000 or more residents identifying their ancestry.

There were 2,373 households, out of which 36.1% had children under the age of 18 living with them, 72.5% were married couples living together, 7.3% had a female householder with no partner present, and 17.2% were non-families. 14.5% of all households were made up of individuals, and 8.3% had someone living alone who was 65 years of age or older. The average household size was 2.91 and the average family size was 3.23.

In the borough the population was spread out, with 23.2% under the age of 18, 5.5% from 18 to 24, 27.5% from 25 to 44, 25.1% from 45 to 64, and 18.8% who were 65 years of age or older. The median age was 41 years. For every 100 females, there were 91.2 males. For every 100 females age 18 and over, there were 87.2 males.

The median income for a household in the borough was $75,556, and the median income for a family was $83,521. Males had a median income of $52,450 versus $36,818 for females. The per capita income for the borough was $31,506. About 1.3% of families and 2.4% of the population were below the poverty line, including 1.3% of those under age 18 and 4.0% of those age 65 or over.

Economy
Pascack Valley Shopping Center is a shopping center located on Kinderkamack Road. It had a movie theater and bowling alley.

Parks and recreation
Parks in the borough include:
 Ackerman Park, located on Ackerman Avenue. It has a playground, basketball courts, a bocci court, and picnic area.
 Centennial Park, located on Main Street, has a gazebo and walking path and a residents-only community garden (opened in 2017) managed by the Environmental Commission. It was named Centennial Park in 2003 in honor Emerson's 100th Anniversary.
 Hillman Park, located on Thomas Street, was created on land donated by borough resident Richard Hillman. It has baseball fields such as, Ken Benkovic Jr. Memorial Field, which was a majors field that is fenced in and a lighted field, and Babes Field which is also a lighted field behind the firehouse but is also located on Thomas Street. There is also a soccer field, and a playground.
 Rosengart Park, sometimes referred as "Sunset Park", is a park located on Sunset Place. It has a playground.
 Veterans' Park, a memorial park located on High Street, with monuments honoring veterans from Emerson.
 Washington Park, a park located on Washington Avenue.General Washington camped at this location before heading to Delaware to cross the Delaware River.It has a playground and a picnic area.
The property was slated for townhouse development, but local opposition resulted in the parcel being purchased by the borough in 2001, with the aid of grants from the county and state. It remains in its natural state, with the addition of trails to make the property accessible to visitors.

Government

Local government
Emerson is governed under the Borough form of New Jersey municipal government, which is used in 218 municipalities (of the 564) statewide, making it the most common form of government in New Jersey. The governing body is comprised of the Mayor and the Borough Council, with all positions elected at-large on a partisan basis as part of the November general election. A Mayor is elected directly by the voters to a four-year term of office. The Borough Council is comprised of six members elected to serve three-year terms on a staggered basis, with two seats coming up for election each year in a three-year cycle. The Borough form of government used in Emerson is a "weak mayor / strong council" government in which council members act as the legislative body with the mayor presiding at meetings and voting only in the event of a tie. The mayor can veto ordinances subject to an override by a two-thirds majority vote of the council. The mayor makes committee and liaison assignments for council members, and most appointments are made by the mayor with the advice and consent of the council.

, the Mayor of Emerson Borough is Republican Danielle DiPaola, whose term of office ends December 31, 2026. Members of the Emerson Borough Council are Council President Michael Timmerman (R, 2023), Nicole Argenzia (R, 2025), Brian Gordon (R, 2024), Jill McGuire (R, 2025), Kelly Moore (R, 2024), Don Pierro (R, 2023, elected to serve an unexpired term).

In September 2021, the Borough Council selected Don Pierro from a list of three candidates nominated by the Republican municipal committee to fill the seat expiring in December 2023 that had been held by Carl Carbo until he resigned to move out of the borough.

In January 2020, the Borough Council selected Patricia L. Dinallo to fill the seat expiring in December 2020 that had been held by Christopher Knoller until he resigned from office late in 2019; with Dinallo taking office and Nicole Argenzia and Jill McGuire sworn in to full terms, Emerson's governing body had a female majority for the first time since the borough was established.

In January 2019, the Borough Council selected Jill McGuire from three candidates nominated by the Republican municipal committee to fill the seat expiring in December 2019 that was vacated by Danielle DiPaola when she took office as the borough's first female mayor.

Day-to-day operation of the Borough is handled by Richard J. Sheola, who serves as Interim Borough Administrator. The Borough Clerk is Jane S. Dietsche and the CFO is Catherine Henderson.

Federal, state and county representation
Emerson is located in the 5th Congressional District and is part of New Jersey's 39th state legislative district.

Politics
As of March 2011, there were a total of 4,690 registered voters in Emerson, of which 905 (19.3% vs. 31.7% countywide) were registered as Democrats, 2,025 (43.2% vs. 21.1%) were registered as Republicans and 1,759 (37.5% vs. 47.1%) were registered as Unaffiliated. There was one voter registered to another party. Among the borough's 2010 Census population, 63.4% (vs. 57.1% in Bergen County) were registered to vote, including 83.3% of those ages 18 and over (vs. 73.7% countywide).

In the 2016 presidential election Republican Donald Trump received 2,188 votes (55.2%), ahead of Democrat Hillary Clinton with 1,629 votes (40.9%) and other candidates with 150 votes (3.8%). In the 2012 presidential election, Republican Mitt Romney received 2,019 votes (55.7% vs. 43.5% countywide), ahead of Democrat Barack Obama with 1,532 votes (42.3% vs. 54.8%) and other candidates with 31 votes (0.9% vs. 0.9%), among the 3,623 ballots cast by the borough's 4,899 registered voters, for a turnout of 74.0% (vs. 70.4% in Bergen County). In the 2008 presidential election, Republican John McCain received 2,206 votes (56.7% vs. 44.5% countywide), ahead of Democrat Barack Obama with 1,636 votes (42.0% vs. 53.9%) and other candidates with 28 votes (0.7% vs. 0.8%), among the 3,893 ballots cast by the borough's 4,922 registered voters, for a turnout of 79.1% (vs. 76.8% in Bergen County).<ref name=Results2008>"2008 General Election Results for Emerson , The Record. Accessed September 14, 2011.</ref> In the 2004 presidential election, Republican George W. Bush received 2,228 votes (58.2% vs. 47.2% countywide), ahead of Democrat John Kerry with 1,553 votes (40.6% vs. 51.7%) and other candidates with 23 votes (0.6% vs. 0.7%), among the 3,829 ballots cast by the borough's 4,913 registered voters, for a turnout of 77.9% (vs. 76.9% in the whole county).

In the 2013 gubernatorial election, Republican Chris Christie received 69.4% of the vote (1,716 cast), ahead of Democrat Barbara Buono with 30.0% (742 votes), and other candidates with 0.6% (16 votes), among the 2,547 ballots cast by the borough's 4,753 registered voters (73 ballots were spoiled), for a turnout of 53.6%. In the 2009 gubernatorial election, Republican Chris Christie received 1,547 votes (55.7% vs. 45.8% countywide), ahead of Democrat Jon Corzine with 1,042 votes (37.5% vs. 48.0%), Independent Chris Daggett with 140 votes (5.0% vs. 4.7%) and other candidates with 11 votes (0.4% vs. 0.5%), among the 2,779 ballots cast by the borough's 4,824 registered voters, yielding a 57.6% turnout (vs. 50.0% in the county).

Education
The Emerson School District serves public school students in pre-kindergarten through twelfth grade. As of the 2018–19 school year, the district, comprised of three schools, had an enrollment of 1,139 students and 98.8 classroom teachers (on an FTE basis), for a student–teacher ratio of 11.5:1. Schools in the district (with 2018–19 enrollment data from the National Center for Education Statistics) are 
Memorial Elementary School with 302 students in Pre-K–2, 
Patrick M. Villano Elementary School with 316 students in grades 3–6 and 
Emerson Jr./Sr. High School with 496 students in grades 7–12.New Jersey School Directory for the Emerson School District, New Jersey Department of Education. Accessed December 29, 2016.

Public school students from the borough, and all of Bergen County, are eligible to attend the secondary education programs offered by the Bergen County Technical Schools, which include the Bergen County Academies in Hackensack, and the Bergen Tech campus in Teterboro or Paramus. The district offers programs on a shared-time or full-time basis, with admission based on a selective application process and tuition covered by the student's home school district.Admissions, Bergen County Technical Schools. Accessed December 23, 2016.

Assumption Academy is a parochial early childhood school that operates under the auspices of the Roman Catholic Archdiocese of Newark.Bergen County Elementary Schools, Roman Catholic Archdiocese of Newark. Accessed July 20, 2016. Assumption Academy closed its elementary school program for grades 1–8 in June 2012 due to declining enrollment, which it had been struggling to keep up for several years prior.

Transportation

Roads and highways

The most significant roads serving Emerson are County Route 502 (Old Hook Road) and County Route 503 (Kinderkamack Road).

Public transportation
The Emerson station, located at the intersection of Linwood Avenue and Kinderkamack Road, provides service on NJ Transit's Pascack Valley Line. This line runs north–south to Hoboken Terminal with connections via the Secaucus Junction transfer station to NJ Transit one-stop service to New York Penn Station and to ten other NJ Transit rail lines. Connections are available at the Hoboken Terminal to other NJ Transit rail lines, the PATH train at the Hoboken PATH station, New York Waterways ferry service to the World Financial Center and other destinations and Hudson-Bergen Light Rail service.

NJ Transit provides bus service on the 165 route to and from the Port Authority Bus Terminal in Midtown Manhattan.Bergen County System Map, NJ Transit. Accessed September 14, 2016.

Rockland Coaches routes 11A/11AT provide service to the Port Authority Bus Terminal and to Rockland County, New York. Saddle River Tours / Ameribus provides service to the George Washington Bridge Bus Station on route 11C.

Bomb threat
On September 19, 2007, there was a threat made to the Emerson School System. A letter addressed to Emerson Mayor Lou Lamatina was received around 10:30 a.m. in a small envelope, along with what appeared to be a computer-printed address pasted onto the front, authorities said. The note inside appeared to also be computer-generated, and was pasted on a blank piece of paper; it read, "All three schools will be blown out on Thursday, Sept. 20th at 11:30 a.m., with two other schools in nearby towns." The note was later sent to the Bergen County Sheriff's Office for forensic examination.

All three Emerson Schools were immediately evacuated by a fire drill around 11:00, and neither students nor teachers were allowed to collect any of their belongings, including backpacks, cell phones, and purses.  Seniors were allowed to retrieve their cars later that day, but nobody else was allowed near the school.

Members of the Bergen County bomb squad were sent to Emerson on Wednesday morning; however, a search of the district's schools revealed nothing dangerous or extraordinary. The bomb squad also searched Oradell and Washington Township schools, and searched Emerson's Assumption Academy on Thursday morning.

Thirteen districts closed their schools for September 20, 2007, including Emerson, Westwood, Washington Township, Oradell, River Edge, Closter, River Vale, Demarest, Haworth, Harrington Park, Northvale, Norwood, and Old Tappan. Some selected Catholic grammar and high schools were closed. The bomb threat affected 12,000–14,000 students, including 1,200 from Emerson alone. The schools were closed for two days until they were deemed safe.

Points of interest
 Cedar Park Cemetery
 Emerson Public Library was formed in 1957 and moved to its current facility in 1974.

Notable people

People who were born in, residents of, or otherwise closely associated with Emerson include:

 Aron Abrams (1960–2010), screenwriter
 Thomas Fitzpatrick (1930–2009), pilot known for two intoxicated flights where he flew from New Jersey and landed on the streets of New York City
 Nicki Gross (born 1989), assistant coach for the Iowa Energy of the NBA Development League
 Kevin Higgins (born 1955), assistant football coach and WR coach at Wake Forest University
 Sonny Igoe (1923–2012), jazz drummer
 Andy Papathanassiou, pit crew coordinator of NASCAR's Hendrick Motorsports

Sources

 Municipal Incorporations of the State of New Jersey (according to Counties)'' prepared by the Division of Local Government, Department of the Treasury (New Jersey); December 1, 1958.
 Clayton, W. Woodford; and Nelson, Nelson. History of Bergen and Passaic Counties, New Jersey, with Biographical Sketches of Many of its Pioneers and Prominent Men. Philadelphia: Everts and Peck, 1882.
 Harvey, Cornelius Burnham (ed.), Genealogical History of Hudson and Bergen Counties, New Jersey. New York: New Jersey Genealogical Publishing Co., 1900.
 Van Valen, James M. History of Bergen County, New Jersey. New York: New Jersey Publishing and Engraving Co., 1900.
 Westervelt, Frances A. (Frances Augusta), 1858–1942, History of Bergen County, New Jersey, 1630–1923, Lewis Historical Publishing Company, 1923.

References

External links

 Emerson Borough website
 Emerson Public Schools
 
 School Data for the Emerson School District, National Center for Education Statistics

 
1903 establishments in New Jersey
Borough form of New Jersey government
Boroughs in Bergen County, New Jersey
Pascack Valley
Populated places established in 1903